Anuga is a genus of moths of the family Euteliidae. The genus was erected by Achille Guenée in 1852.

Species
Anuga brevis Prout, 1928 Sumatra
Anuga canescens (Walker, [1863]) Borneo
Anuga cineracea Wileman & West, 1928 Philippines
Anuga constricta Guenée, 1852 Oriental tropics - Sundaland, Philippines, Sulawesi
Anuga elegans Prout, 1928 Sumatra
Anuga fida C. Swinhoe, 1902 Peninsular Malaysia, Sumatra, Borneo
Anuga fidoides Holloway, 1985 Borneo
Anuga indigofera Holloway, 1976 Peninsular Malaysia, Sumatra, Borneo
Anuga insuffusa Warren, 1914 Peninsular Malaysia, Sumatra, Myanmar, Thailand, Borneo
Anuga japonica (Leech, 1889) Japan
Anuga juventa C. Swinhoe, 1902 Peninsular Malaysia, Borneo
Anuga juventoides Holloway, 1985 Borneo, Sumatra
Anuga kobesi Holloway, 1985 Sundaland (not Bali)
Anuga lunulata Moore, 1867 Bengal
Anuga multiplicans (Walker, 1858) Canara
Anuga rotunda Holloway, 1976 Borneo
Anuga supraconstricta Yoshimoto, 1993 Nepal
Anuga violescens (Mell, 1943) Kuangtung

References

Euteliinae
Noctuoidea genera